Marjan Gjurov (born May 4, 1980) is a Macedonian professional basketball small forward who last played for Rabotnički.

References

External links
 Career Stats from www.proballers.com
 www.foxsportspulse.com 
 Marjan Gjurov
 Marjan Gjurov Player Profile, KK Rabotnicki AD Skipje, International Stats, Game Logs, Awards - RealGM
 Marjan Gjurov

1980 births
Living people
Macedonian men's basketball players
Sportspeople from Štip
Small forwards
KK Rabotnički players
KK Vardar players